John D'Oyly may refer to:

Sir John D'Oyly, 1st Baronet, of Chislehampton (1640–1709), MP for Woodstock (UK Parliament constituency)  
Sir John D'Oyly, 1st Baronet, of Kandy (1774–1824), British colonial administrator
Sir John D'Oyly, 2nd Baronet (1670–1746), of the D'Oyly baronets
Sir John D'Oyly, 4th Baronet (1702–1773), of the D'Oyly baronets
Sir John D'Oyly, 6th Baronet (1754–1818), MP for Ipswich
Sir John D'Oyly, 8th Baronet (1794–1869), of the D'Oyly baronets
Sir John D'Oyly, 13th Baronet (1900–1986), of the D'Oyly baronets